Nuneaton is a constituency represented in the House of Commons of the UK Parliament since 2010 by Marcus Jones, a Conservative. Since 1997, the seat has been seen as an important national bellwether.

In the 2015 general election, Nuneaton was the first key marginal seat between the Conservatives and Labour to declare its results. Instead of seeing the predicted victory for Labour, the seat saw a swing of 3.0% towards the Conservatives which proved to be a big indication that they were heading for victory in the 2015 general election, contrary to prior opinion poll projections.

Boundaries 

1885–1918: The Sessional Division of Coventry and part of the Sessional Divisions of Atherstone and Coleshill.

1918–1945: The Municipal Borough of Nuneaton, the Urban District of Bulkington, and the Rural Districts of Atherstone, Coventry, Foleshill, and Nuneaton.

1945–1955: The Municipal Borough of Nuneaton, the Urban District of Bedworth, and the Rural District of Atherstone.

1955–1974: The Municipal Borough of Nuneaton, and the Urban District of Bedworth.

1974–1983: The Municipal Borough of Nuneaton, and the Urban District of Bedworth as altered by the Coventry Order 1965.

1983–2010: The Borough of Nuneaton and Bedworth wards of Abbey, Arbury, Attleborough, Bulkington, Camp Hill, Chilvers Coton, Galley Common, St Nicolas, Stockingford, Weddington, and Whitestone, and the Borough of Rugby wards of Earl Craven, Fosse, and Wolvey.

2010–present: The Borough of Nuneaton and Bedworth wards of Abbey, Arbury, Attleborough, Bar Pool, Camp Hill, Galley Common, Kingswood, St Nicolas, Weddington, Wem Brook, and Whitestone, and the Borough of North Warwickshire wards of Arley and Whitacre, and Hartshill.

The boundary changes which took effect for the 1983 general election removed the town of Bedworth, which was transferred to the newly created North Warwickshire constituency. As a result, the sitting MP Les Huckfield declined to stand and unsuccessfully sought nomination in other constituencies such as Wigan and Sedgefield.

History 
The constituency was created as a result of the Redistribution of Seats Act 1885, in an area whose population had expanded as coal miners poured in from other parts of the country. At one time 20 collieries operated in the area and now one of three major British coal mines continued with operations in the constituency at Daw Mill atop the Warwickshire Coalfield (known as the Warwickshire Thick) in the north of the county until 2012 when it closed. The associated heavy industry and mining-centred economy coupled with the Representation of the People Act 1918 (Fourth Reform Act) led to Nuneaton being held by the Labour Party for nearly 50 years until lost in the 1983 Conservative Landslide to Lewis Stevens, a Conservative who retained the seat in 1987.

Labour regained the constituency at the 1992 election. Bill Olner beat Stevens and retained the seat in 1997, 2001 and 2005. Olner announced in 2007 that he would not be contesting the 2010 general election and would be standing down at the end of the 2005–2010 parliament. Former Nuneaton and Bedworth Council Leader Marcus Jones was successful in taking the seat for the Conservative Party at the 2010 election and retained the seat in 2015, 2017 and 2019.

2015 general election significance 

In the 2015 general election, Nuneaton was the first marginal constituency between the Conservatives and Labour to declare its results. The result proved to be significant as it saw a 3.0% swing to the Conservatives, despite the seat being Labour's 38th biggest target and Labour being predicted to win the seat. The result therefore proved to be a major indication that the Conservatives were going to win a majority of seats in the House of Commons for the first time since the 1992 general election, something which went against national opinion polls which pointed towards Labour gains in the key marginal constituencies.

It was later reported that the moment incumbent Prime Minister David Cameron knew his Conservative Party had won the general election was when Nuneaton declared its results at 1.53 am on 8 May 2015.

This has led to many pointing out the similarities between Nuneaton and the former constituency of Basildon which in 1987 and 1992, Labour unexpectedly failed to win. This is why the Nuneaton result has been seen as the 'Basildon Moment' of 2015, since the Basildon constituency similarly foreshadowed the Conservative's election victory in 1992.

Nuneaton was chosen by the Labour Party as the host of their first televised leadership debate during their 2015 leadership election.

Members of Parliament

Elections

Elections in the 2010s

Elections in the 2000s

Elections in the 1990s

Elections in the 1980s

Elections in the 1970s

Elections in the 1960s

Elections in the 1950s

Elections in the 1940s 

General Election 1939–40:
Another general election was required to take place before the end of 1940. The political parties had been making preparations for an election to take place from 1939 and by the end of this year, the following candidates had been selected; 
Labour: Reginald Fletcher

Elections in the 1930s

Elections in the 1920s

Elections in the 1910s 

 denotes candidate who was endorsed by the Coalition Government.

Election results 1885-1918

Elections in the 1880s

Elections in the 1890s

Elections in the 1900s

Elections in the 1910s

General Election 1914–15:

Another General Election was required to take place before the end of 1915. The political parties had been making preparations for an election to take place and by July 1914, the following candidates had been selected; 
Liberal-Labour: William Johnson
Unionist:

See also 
 List of parliamentary constituencies in Warwickshire

References
Specific

General
Craig, F. W. S. (1983). British parliamentary election results 1918-1949 (3 ed.). Chichester: Parliamentary Research Services. .

Notes
Notes

External links 
Nuneaton Labour, Jayne Innes
Nuneaton Conservatives

Nuneaton
Parliamentary constituencies in Warwickshire
Constituencies of the Parliament of the United Kingdom established in 1885